Sitarampur is a neighbourhood in Asansol, West Bengal. It is governed by the Asansol Municipal Corporation, and was one of the early hubs of coal mining activity.

Geography

Location

Urbanisation
According to the 2011 Census of India, 83.33% of the population of Asansol Sadar subdivision was urban and 16.67% was rural. The Asansol Sadar subdivision had 26 census towns.

Asansol Municipal Corporation
According to the Kolkata Gazette notification on 3 June 2015, the municipal areas of Kulti, Raniganj and Jamuria were included within the jurisdiction of Asansol Municipal Corporation.

History

Coal mines
Coal in India was first discovered around Sitarampur. The early mines were Baro Dhemo and Sundarchak, which are now defunct. As those mines started to dry up, new virgin plots were excavated, some of which extended beyond the Damodar River into the Purulia district, and beyond River Barakar into the Nirsa of Dhanbad district in Jharkhand.

Mines safety
With hectic operations in the mines, accidents occurred frequently leading to loss of life. The government regulated the mining process with the Directorate of Mines Safety. It inspected mining procedures with firm laws and imposed hard penalties for non-compliance, which resulted in an accident and fatality reduction. The zonal office of the Directorate General of Mines Safety is located at Sitarampur.

A small captive explosive manufacturing factory was established at Sitarampur to supply dynamite for solid blasting in open cast mines. The unit was in operation from around 1914 to 1935.

Demographics

Language

It mainly consists of Bengali, Gujarati, Marwari, and Hindi-speaking people from Bihar and Jharkhand. Bengali is the official language in Sitarampur.

Economy

Coal
Sitarampur is mainly a coal-mining center, and many people in Sitarampur and Neamatpur work in the coal mines of Eastern Coalfields.

Collieries in the Sitarampur Area of Eastern Coalfields are: Mithani, Bejdi, Dhemomain, Narsamuda, BC Incline and Patmohana.

Transport

As coal became transported by train more frequently, a new railway line, the Grand Chord, was laid from Sitarampur to Mughalsarai.

The Howrah-Delhi rail track separates into the Main and Grand Chord lines at Sitarampur and rejoins at Mughalsarai.

Some major trains that stop at Sitarampur are Dhanbad - Howrah Coalfield Express and Black Diamond Express, Kathgodum Express, and Mithila Express.

Sitarampur is connected by the Grand Trunk Road, which passes through Neamatpur.

References

Neighbourhoods in Asansol